The 2015 Colchester Borough Council election took place on 7 May 2015 to elect one third of the members of Colchester Borough Council in England. This was the same day as other local elections and as the General Election.  Colchester Borough Council is made up of 60 councillors: 20 councillors were up for election.

Prior to the elections, Liberal Democrat councillor for New Town ward, Theresa Higgins, was appointed Mayor of Colchester for a term of one-year.

Composition of council seats before election
Prior to the election the composition of the council was:

After the election, the composition of the council was:

Candidates by party

The Liberal Democrats, Conservatives, Labour Party and Green Party all stood a full slate of 20 candidates. UKIP stood 15 candidates and 3 independents (including a candidate with the description 'Patriotic Socialist Party') stood for election.

Results Summary
With 30 seats required for a dead-heat majority (of 0), no single grouping of councillors remained in overall control of policy decision-making.  Conservatives fell 3 short this time whereas at the last election a five-becoming-six seat deficit existed during the four-year term for the largest grouping which had been the Liberal Democrats.

Ward results

No turnout figures were provided by the council.

Berechurch

Birch & Winstree

Castle 

No UKIP candidate as previous (-15.0).

Christ Church

Copford & West Stanway

Fordham & Stour

Great Tey

Highwoods

Mile End

New Town

Prettygate

Shrub End

St. Andrew's

St. Anne's

Stanway

No UKIP candidate as previous (-20.8).

Tiptree

West Bergholt & Eight Ash Green

West Mersea

Wivenhoe Cross

Wivenhoe Quay

By-elections

Dedham & Langham

In June 2015, in accordance with the Local Government Act 1972, Conservative councillor Mark Cable "ceased to be a member of the council" after failing to attend a council meeting since December 2014 (6 months). A by-election was called and the ward was subsequently held by the Conservatives.

References

2015 English local elections
May 2015 events in the United Kingdom
2015
2010s in Essex